The 23rd July Lake or Benghazi Lake is a lagoon located between Benghazi's downtown, and the Mediterranean Port of Benghazi. It covers an area of approximately 100 hectares (about 1,000,000 square metres).

References

Lakes of Libya
Benghazi